The 1989–90 Eastern Counties Football League season was the 48th in the history of Eastern Counties Football League a football competition in England.

Premier Division

The Premier Division featured 19 clubs which competed in the division last season, along with two new clubs, promoted from Division One:
Halstead Town
Wroxham

League table

Division One

Division One featured twelve clubs which competed in the division last season, along with five new clubs:
Cornard United, joined from the Essex and Suffolk Border League]
Ely City, relegated from the Premier Division
Norwich United, joined from the Anglian Combination
Soham Town Rangers, relegated from the Premier Division
Woodbridge Town, joined from the Suffolk and Ipswich League

Also, Loadwell Ipswich changed name to Ipswich Wanderers.

League table

References

External links
 Eastern Counties Football League

1989-90
1989–90 in English football leagues